Idris Imad al-Din (1392 – 10 June 1468) was the 19th Tayyibi Isma'ili Dāʿī al-Muṭlaq and a major religious and political leader in 15th-century Yemen, as well as a notable theologian and the most important medieval Isma'ili historian. His work is fundamental for the history of the Fatimid Caliphate and the Isma'ili communities in Yemen.

Life
Born in 1392 at Shibam in northern Yemen, Idris was descended from the Banu al-Walid al-Anf family, of the Quraysh tribe. The family had provided the Tayyibi Isma'ili head missionaries (dāʿīs) in Yemen reaching back to the early 13th century. The full title of these missionaries, Dāʿī al-Muṭlaq ("absolute/unrestricted missionary") signified their position as virtual rulers of the Tayyibi community in their capacity as vicegerents of the absent Imam, the eponymous at-Tayyib Abu'l-Qasim, who remained in occultation. This authority extended over not only Yemen, but the Tayyibi community in India as well. Idris' grandfather Abdallah Fakhr al-Din was the sixteenth Dāʿī al-Muṭlaq, followed by his father al-Hasan Badr al-Din I, and after his death in 1418 by his uncle Ali Shams al-Din II, who died in 1428.

As a youth, Idris received a thorough education, and was active in the governance of the Tayyibi community. When his uncle died in 1428, he succeeded him as the nineteenth Dāʿī al-Muṭlaq, a position he would hold throughout the remainder of his life. His first residence was the citadel of Haraz. Like his predecessors, he was allied with the Rasulids of Zabid against the Zaydi imams of Sana'a. With the Rasulid al-Malik al-Zahir he repeatedly fought against the Zaydi imam al-Mansur Ali, and recaptured numerous fortresses from Zaydi control. When the Rasulids were replaced by the Tahirids in 1454, Idris maintained friendly relations with the new rulers of Zabid, the Tahirid brothers Amir and Ali. After a disastrous plague in 1436/7, which cost him several relatives, he returned to his native Shibam. The Sunni Bohra break off from the Dawoodi Bohra during the leadership of Idris.

Idris paid particular attention to the missionary efforts in western India, and contributed to the success of Tayyibi missionaries in Gujarat. According to the later Indian Tayyibi scholars Khawj ibn Malak and Shaykh Qutb, it was Idris who first planned to move the seat of the Tayyibi missionary movement from Yemen to India, although in the event this did not take place until a century after his death on 10 June 1468. His sons, al-Hasan Badr al-Din II, and al-Husayn Husam al-Din, and then his grandsons, Ali Shams al-Din III and Muhammad Izz al-Din I, succeeded him as Dāʿī al-Muṭlaq. Muhammad Izz al-Din I, the 23rd Dāʿī al-Muṭlaq, was the last of his line, and on his death the first Indian, Yusuf ibn Sulayman, was nominated as his successor.

The mausoleum of Idris in Shibam was reconstructed in 2010 by the 52nd Dāʿī al-Muṭlaq of the Dawoodi Bohra branch of Tayyibi Isma'ilism, and is a frequent pilgrimage destination for Bohra faithful from both Yemen and India.

Works

Alongside his religious and political duties, Idris was also a dedicated scholar and prolific writer. His books "would become foundational works of the Ṭayyibi daʿwa". His favourite writing spot, next to the lake Birkat Jawjab near Shibam, is still pointed out to visitors today. The 16th-century Tayyibi scholar Hasan ibn Nuh ascribes eleven works to Idris. The modern historian Ayman Fuʾad Sayyid enumerates eleven whose authorship is certain, and three more where it is attributed to Idris, but doubtful.

During the epidemic, Syedna Idris initiated namaaz and dua of Daf'il Aafaat. The text of this dua implores Allah to grant protection from  calamities, disasters, the malevolence of evil-doers and to allay fears, to safeguard against famine, mishaps, disease and epidemics. This namaaz is currently offered daily by Dawoodi Bohras after Maghrib prayer.

Historical works
His main work is the seven-volume ʿUyūn al-akhbār ("Flowing springs of historical reports"), a history of Islam from Muhammad, through the 21 Isma'ili Imams up to the end of the Fatimid Caliphate, as well as the start of the Tayyibi daʿwa in Yemen under the Sulayhid dynasty. In it, Idris made use of a large number of Isma'ili and non-Isma'ili sources, some of which do no longer survive. The only general history of Isma'ilism actually written by an Isma'ili author during the Middle Ages, this work has established him as the "most famous Isma'ili historian", according to Farhad Daftary, and provides a unique Isma'ili perspective on the history of the Fatimid Caliphate and its proxies in Yemen. Along with the work of his Egyptian contemporary, al-Maqrizi, the ʿUyūn al-akhbār is "arguably the most detailed source of Fatimid history".

The ʿUyūn al-akhbār has been published in a number of critical editions:
 Volumes 4–6, edited by Mustafa Ghalib, Dar al-Andalus, Beirut 1975–1984
 Volume 5, focusing on the Fatimids, edited by Farhat Dashrawi, Tunis 1979 and again by Muhammad al-Ya'llawi, Dar al-Gharb al-Islami, Beirut 1985
 All seven volumes by Ahmad Chleilat, Mahmoud Fakhoury, Yousef S. Fattoum, Ma'moun Sagherji, and Ayman Fu'ad Sayyid, London and Damascus 2007–2010
 Excerpts from volumes 5 and 6 were translated into English by Shainool Jiwa in The Founder of Cairo. The Fatimid Imam-Caliph al-Muʿizz and his Era, I.B. Tauris, London and New York 2013
 Volume 7, with a summarized English translation, by Ayman Fu'ad Sayyid with Paul Walker and Maurice Pomerantz, as The Fatimids and their successors in Yaman: The History of an Islamic Community, I.B. Tauris (in association with the Institute of Ismaili Studies), London and New York 2002

The ʿUyūn al-akhbār is complemented by two smaller works, the two-volume Nuzhat al-afkār ("A promenade for minds" or "The pleasure of the thoughts"), and its continuation, the Rawḍat al-akhbār ("A garden of historical reports/information"), which specifically focus on the Tayyibi community in Yemen from the collapse of the Sulayhid dynasty to Idris' own day.

Theological works
Among his theological works, the Zahr al-maʿānī ("Flowers of the meanings"), a treatise on Tayyibi esoteric doctrine (ḥaqāʾiq), stands out as the "high mark of Tayyibi writings" (Daftary). The metaphysical ideas of the 11th-century dāʿī Hamid al-Din al-Kirmani provided particular inspiration to Idris. He also composed six shorter theological diatribes: one in question-and-answer format on theological questions; a theological exegesis of aspects connected to the Islamic calendar; a treatise on strictly keeping the full fast of Ramadan; a refutation of a Zaydi theological treatise; a polemic treatise against an atheist referred to only as "The Camel"; and a refutation of the practice of some Indians of watching the moon to determine the start and end of Ramadan.

Finally, he was the author of a diwan, in which he emulated the Fatimid-era poet al-Mu'ayyad al-Shirazi. The subjects of his poems were mostly religious, offering praise to Muhammad, Ali and his family, the Isma'ili imams. Some deal with issues of doctrine, but others express his own spiritual beliefs.

References

Sources
 
 
 
 
 

1392 births
1468 deaths
15th-century Arabic poets
15th-century historians of the medieval Islamic world
15th-century monarchs in the Middle East
Arab historians
Banu al-Walid al-Anf
Burials in Yemen
15th century in Yemen
Ismaili theologians
Tayyibi da'is
History of Ismailism
15th-century Arabs
15th-century Ismailis
15th-century Islamic religious leaders